"Dame Tu Cosita" (lit. "Give me your little thing" or "give me your thingy") is a song by Panamanian artist El Chombo, featuring Jamaican dancehall musician Cutty Ranks. It was originally recorded in 1997, but extended and released as a single in 2018. A remix with Pitbull and Karol G was released on August 29, 2018. The music video contains a female green alien dancing to the song.

History
The song was first released on El Chombo's album Cuentos de la Cripta II (1997) as a short version under the title "Introduccion B (El Cosita Mix)". A remix of the song titled "Cosita Mix (New Mix)" was released in 2001 on the album Cuentos de la Cripta Remixes, in which the 2018 version is based on.

Following the song's viral Internet popularity, French record label Juston Records signed El Chombo and commissioned an extended version of the track. The label also acquired the rights to ArtNoux's video and requested a new video for the extended track.

Ultra Music acquired the worldwide distribution rights to the new, extended song and music video. In April 2018, the music video was uploaded to Ultra's YouTube channel, and its popularity skyrocketed. The track was released as a single soon after, which debuted at No. 81 on the Billboard Hot 100, eventually reaching a peak of No. 36.

Pitbull and Karol G Remix
A remix featuring Pitbull and Karol G was released on August 24, 2018, and was produced by El Chombo and Afro Bros. The remix charted at No. 1 on the Billboard Bubbling Under Hot 100 chart, which serves as an extension to the Billboard Hot 100 chart. It also reached No. 31 on the Billboard Argentina Hot 100.

Music video 
The video shows an extended animation of the alien video to the full remix of "Dame Tu Cosita", animated by ArtNoux and directed by Sihem OUILLANI. The video was the seventh most-viewed music video on YouTube worldwide in 2018. As of August 2022, the YouTube video has received over 4 billion views, making it the site's 13th most-viewed video. The music video of the remix with Pitbull and Karol G was also directed by Sihem OUILLANI and was shot in Florida.

Charts

Weekly charts

Year-end charts

Certifications

See also
List of Billboard number-one Latin songs of 2018

References

1997 songs
2018 singles
El Chombo songs
Pitbull (rapper) songs
Karol G songs
Internet memes introduced in 2018
Novelty and fad dances
Viral videos
Animated music videos